William Lucking (June 17, 1941 – October 18, 2021) was an American film, television, and stage actor, best known for his role as Piney Winston in Sons of Anarchy (2008–2011), and for his movie roles in The Magnificent Seven Ride! (1972), and The Rundown (2003). He was also known for his portrayal of Col. Lynch in the first season of the 1980s TV show The A-Team.

Career

Film and television 
The Vicksburg, Michigan native has played tough bikers in Hell's Belles (1969) and Wild Rovers (1971), craggy cowboys in The Magnificent Seven Ride! (1972) and The Return of a Man Called Horse (1976), and determined military and police officers in Doc Savage: The Man of Bronze (1975) and K-PAX (2001). His other film work includes appearances in Oklahoma Crude (1973), The Crazy World of Julius Vrooder (1974), 10 (1979), The French Atlantic Affair (1979), Captain America II: Death Too Soon (1979), The Ninth Configuration (1980), The Mountain Men (1980), Coast to Coast (1980), Stripes (1981), Ladykillers (1988), False Identity (1990), Extreme Justice (1993), The River Wild (1994), The Limey (1999), Erin Brockovich (2000), Red Dragon (2002), The Rundown (2003), The World's Fastest Indian (2005), and Contraband (2012).

On television, he has had starring or featured roles in Outlaws as Harland Pike, The A-Team as Colonel Lynch, and the aforementioned Sons of Anarchy. He has appeared on such television series as Mission: Impossible, The Partridge Family, Simon & Simon, Bonanza, Kung Fu, Baa Baa Black Sheep, Gunsmoke, The Rockford Files, The Waltons, The Incredible Hulk, Knight Rider, Magnum, P.I., M*A*S*H, Hunter,  In the Heat of the Night, The Greatest American Hero, Murder, She Wrote, NYPD Blue, Star Trek: Deep Space Nine, JAG, Walker, Texas Ranger, The X Files, ER, The Pretender, Profiler, The West Wing, Cold Case, Tales of the Gold Monkey, Star Trek: Enterprise and The Young Riders, among other television shows.

Theater 
Lucking graduated from UCLA and the Pasadena Playhouse with degrees in literature and theater. In 1986, with fellow actor and Michigan native Dana Elcar, he co-founded the Santa Paula Theater Center.

As co-instructor of the company's free acting workshop he was admired for his minimalist approach; a counterpoint to Elcar's methodical style. He served alongside Elcar as artistic director for five seasons. He produced such projects as Edward Albee's The Zoo Story, Harold Pinter's The Hothouse, George Bernard Shaw's Major Barbara, Tennessee Williams' Camino Real, and Robert Penn Warren's All the King's Men. His most recent stage roles include Blue in the CTG/Ahmanson production of Conversations with My Father at the Doolittle Theater in Los Angeles and Dr. Sloper in the Ensemble Theater Company of Santa Barbara's production of The Heiress.

Personal life and death 
Lucking was married to his first wife, Marycarolyn "Mimi" Hawkins from 1965 until her death from cancer in 1995. He and Mimi have 2 daughters, Marjet Lucking and Juliana Lucking Ryan. Lucking was married to his second wife, Sigrid Insull, a costume designer from 1996 until his death in 2021. Lucking died at his home in Las Vegas, Nevada, on October 18, 2021, at the age of 80.

Filmography

References

External links 
 
 The Working Actor
 TV Guide Bio

1941 births
2021 deaths
American male film actors
American male television actors
American theatre directors
Male actors from Michigan
People from Vicksburg, Michigan
University of California, Los Angeles alumni